Harry W. Tetrick (May 6, 1911 – March 17, 1977) was an American sound engineer. He was nominated for three Academy Awards in the category Best Sound.

Selected filmography
 The Wind and the Lion (1975)
 Rocky (1976)
 King Kong (1976)

References

External links

1911 births
1977 deaths
American audio engineers
People from Solana Beach, California
Engineers from California
20th-century American engineers